John "Johnny" Koutroumbis (born 6 March 1998) is an Australian professional football (soccer) player who plays as a defender for Perth Glory.

Club career

Newcastle Jets
After initially signing with Newcastle Jets as an injury replacement for Daniel Alessi, on 2 February 2017, Newcastle Jets signed Koutroumbis on a two-year deal. He mutually terminated his contract with the club in July 2021.

Western Sydney Wanderers
In July 2021, Koutroumbis joined Western Sydney Wanderers on a two-year deal.

Personal life
Koutroumbis was born in Australia and is of Greek descent. In late 2018, Koutrombis was sidelined because he contracted stage 1 thyroid cancer.

References

External links

Living people
1998 births
Australian people of Greek descent
Australian soccer players
Association football defenders
West Adelaide SC players
Adelaide United FC players
Newcastle Jets FC players
Western Sydney Wanderers FC players
Perth Glory FC players
National Premier Leagues players
A-League Men players